Trapped is a 2002 crime thriller film directed by Luis Mandoki and starring Charlize Theron, Courtney Love, Stuart Townsend, Kevin Bacon, Dakota Fanning and Pruitt Taylor Vince. Based on Greg Iles' bestselling novel 24 Hours, it follows a wealthy Portland, Oregon, couple whose daughter is kidnapped by a mysterious man and his wife who demand a ransom for unclear reasons.

Filmed in British Columbia in the spring of 2001, Trapped was released theatrically by Columbia Pictures on September 20, 2002. It received largely unfavorable reviews from critics, and was a box-office bomb, earning $13.4 million against its $30 million budget.

Plot
Dr. Will Jennings, a research physician, has landed his major career break by patenting a new anesthetic drug. After speaking at a conference regarding the patent in a Seattle hotel, he is met by a strange woman, Cheryl, who introduces herself as an admirer of his work. Cheryl attempts to seduce Will in the hallway, before holding him at gunpoint and forcing him into his hotel room. She demands a ransom for his young daughter, Abby. Meanwhile, Cheryl's husband, Joe, has broken into Will's luxurious Portland, Oregon home, and confronts Will's wife, Karen, who has returned after picking Abby up from school. Joe sends Abby away with his cousin, Marvin, while Karen attempts to fight the attack, but is ultimately thwarted when Joe holds her hostage at gunpoint.

Marvin drives Abby to a remote cabin in the woods, but soon discovers that Abby suffers from asthma and is dependent on an inhaler. Abby begins to have an asthma attack, which causes Marvin to panic and phone Joe. Joe agrees to drive Karen to the cabin to administer the inhaler, blindfolding her for the car ride. An emotional Karen stops Abby's attack with the medication, but is quickly forced back into the car by Joe. Joe brings Karen back to her home, where she attempts to fight him, but he subdues her. When her neighbor, Joan, stops by unannounced, Karen is forced to pretend that she has been caught having an affair with Joe. After Joan leaves, Karen manages to slash Joe with a concealed scalpel and locks herself in the bathroom where she receives a phone call from Abby, who has snuck out of the cabin with Marvin's cell phone. The call is short-lived, however, as Marvin recaptures Abby, and Joe forces his way into the bathroom. With Karen under his control again, Joe makes her suture his wound.

At the hotel, Will manages to inject Cheryl with succinylcholine, paralyzing her and bringing her near the edge of death before he administers an antidote. Fearing for her life, Cheryl also loses her nerve, and admits to Will that she and Joe constructed the plot as revenge for their daughter, Katie, who died during a recent brain operation; Will assisted on Katie's surgery. When Will explains that he was wrongly implicated by the head surgeon in the negligence that caused Katie's death, Cheryl begins to sympathize with him, and agrees to botch the plan.

In the morning, Cheryl accompanies Will to a bank to retrieve the ransom money while they are monitored by police. Joe and Cheryl have a heated argument on the phone, in which it is revealed that Joe intended to keep Abby after receiving the ransom and raise her as his own daughter. Will and Cheryl board a seaplane to fly toward Portland, where Joe and Karen are embarking on a freeway toward them to exchange the money; traveling behind them are Marvin and Abby in a separate SUV. Karen attacks Joe in the car, forcing them off the freeway. As Will and Cheryl fly over the freeway, they spot Joe's car, and land the seaplane on the road, causing a multi-car pileup. Marvin loses control of the SUV in the melee and crashes.

While Joe chastises Cheryl, Marvin orders Abby out of the car, and urges her to find her parents. Abby is briefly captured by Cheryl, but released when a physical fight ensues between Will and Joe, which ultimately ends with Karen shooting Joe to death. Police and agents of the FBI descend on the scene as Abby suffers another asthma attack, but Karen is able to treat her with the inhaler. Cheryl is captured by police as Karen, Will, and Abby embrace.

Cast
Charlize Theron as Karen Jennings
Courtney Love as Cheryl Hickey
Stuart Townsend as Dr. Will Jennings
Kevin Bacon as Joe Hickey
Dakota Fanning as Abigail (Abby) Jennings
Pruitt Taylor Vince as Marvin
Colleen Camp as Joan Evans
Steve Rankin as Hank Ferris
Garry Chalk as Agent Chalmers
Jodie Markell as Mary McDill
Matt Koby as Peter McDill
Gerry Becker as Dr. Stein
Andrew Airlie as Holden
Randi Lynne as Hotel Operator
J. B. Bivens as Gray Davidson
John Scott as SWAT leader
Gregory Bennett as Heins

Production

Filming
Principal photography of Trapped, originally titled 24 Hours, began in Vancouver, British Columbia on March 19, 2001, and concluded on June 13 of that year. The film's climactic freeway sequence was shot on Highway 19 near the Courtenay/Cumberland interchange at Buckley Bay, between May 22 and June 5.

Release

Box office
Trapped was released theatrically in the United States on September 20, 2002, opening in 2,227 theaters. During its opening weekend, the film earned $3,210,765. It remained in theatrical release for 103 days domestically, ultimately grossing $7,073,251 in the United States. It earned a further $6,341,165 in international markets, making for a worldwide gross of $13,414,416.

Critical response
On the film-critic aggregator Rotten Tomatoes, Trapped earned 17% positive reviews based on 58 reviews. The site's consensus reads: "With its plot about child kidnapping and endangerment, Trapped is an exploitative thriller, more queasy than suspenseful."

Lisa Schwarzbaum of Entertainment Weekly called the film "a negligible work of manipulation, an exploitation piece doing its usual worst to guilt-trip parents." She felt "The most frightening sight, though, is that of Theron and Bacon, good actors trapped in the muck of making a living." Robert K. Elder of the Chicago Tribune wrote: "Excellent abduction films such as Breakdown and the original The Vanishing maintain a sense of danger and claustrophobia by keeping the conflicts mostly internal, turning up the temperature under a fluctuating tone of emotional duress. Trapped splashes its drama all over the screen, subjecting its audience and characters to action that feels not only manufactured, but also so false you can see the filmmakers' puppet strings." One of the few critics who gave a favorable review was Megan Turner of the New York Post who described the film as "a tightly drawn, propulsive thriller with some pleasingly unexpected kinks in the tale and a couple of believable performances from Charlize Theron and Kevin Bacon in the leads."

Home media
Trapped was released on DVD by Columbia/TriStar Home Entertainment on December 24, 2002. It was subsequently issued on Blu-ray by Mill Creek Entertainment as a double feature with In the Cut. Mill Creek finally released the standalone Blu-ray on April 7, 2020.

References

External links

2002 films
2002 crime thriller films
American crime thriller films
American thriller drama films
Columbia Pictures films
2000s English-language films
Films about hostage takings
Films about kidnapping
Films about families
Films based on American novels
Films based on crime novels
Films based on thriller novels
Films directed by Luis Mandoki
Films scored by John Ottman
Films set in Portland, Oregon
Films set in Seattle
Films shot in Vancouver
German crime thriller films
German thriller drama films
Home invasions in film
2000s American films
2000s German films